The Jacaré River, or Jacarezinho River, is a river in the Paraná state in southern Brazil. It is a tributary of the Das Cinzas River and inspired the name of the town of Jacarezinho.

See also
List of rivers of Paraná

References

Rivers of Paraná (state)